This is a list of British Army Army Air Corps aircraft units.

Wings
 No. 1 Wing AAC 
 No. 2 Wing AAC

Brigades
 1st Aviation Brigade

Regiments
 1 Regiment
 2 (Training) Regiment
 3 Regiment
 4 Regiment
 5 Regiment
 6 Regiment
 7 (Training) Regiment
 9 Regiment

Squadrons

Current squadrons

Former squadrons

Flights

Current flights

Former flights

References

Citations

Bibliography

Army Air Corps (United Kingdom)
Army Air
Army Air Corps aircraft squadrons